Pattukkottai Prabakar is an Indian Tamil writer. He is the ultimate King of Crime and Thriller novels, also a versatile writer. Apart from print media, He is also a screenwriter for movies as well as TV. Pattukkottai Prabakar was born to Shri. V. Radhakrishnan and Smt.R.Chandra on 30 July 1958. He completed his Masters in Economics in St.Joseph's college, Trichy.  He pursued his career as a writer.

Career 
His debut as an author was in 1977, when his work was published in Ananda Vikatan. So far he has penned 250+ short stories, 300+ novels, 85+ serial stories. More than 200 works has been published by several publishers as special edition books. A monthly magazine named A novel time was publishing only his novels. His famous works are Bharath Susila Detective series. His versatility has taken his works to other languages too. He ran Ungal junior and ullasa oonjal monthly magazines for ten years. He has worked as assistant director and assisted in making scripts for 2 films with director Mr.K.Bhakyaraj (Avasara police-100, Pavunu pavunuthan) He has contributed towards the script and dialogues for up to 25 Tamil films. He has also worked for Paramapadham, the first Tamil-language "mega-serial" telecasted on Doordarshan. He continued to contribute on small screen mega serials.

Notable works 
The detective series Bharath and Susila is the most popular novels amongst his fans. He has written more than 15 novels with only dialogues and no narration. His works like Maram and Kanavugal ilavasam are part of literature syllabus in private colleges and three M.Phil scholars have written a thesis on his writings. "Irandu vari kaviyam" is a Thirukural book that explains each kural in two simple lines. 7 of his short stories were telecasted as single episodes in Sun TV, directed by director Balu Mahendra (Kathai Neram)

Filmography

Television

References

See also 
 dinamalar
 Pattukottai Prabakar novels are available as e-books at Pustaka

Tamil screenwriters
Novelists from Tamil Nadu
Living people
1958 births
People from Thanjavur district
Tamil-language writers
21st-century Indian novelists
Indian male novelists
21st-century Indian male writers
Screenwriters from Tamil Nadu
21st-century Indian screenwriters